Isabelle Anne Madeleine Huppert (born 16 March 1953) is a French actress. Described as "one of the best actresses in the world", she is known for her portrayals of cold and disdainful characters devoid of morality. She is the recipient of several accolades, including two César Awards, five Lumières Awards, a BAFTA Award, three European Film Awards, two Berlin International Film Festival, three Cannes Film Festival and Venice Film Festival honors, a Golden Globe Award, and an Academy Award nomination; in 2020, The New York Times ranked her second on its list of the greatest actors of the 21st century.

Huppert's first César Award nomination for Best Supporting Actress was for Aloïse (1975). She won the BAFTA Award for Most Promising Newcomer for The Lacemaker (1977). She went on to win two Cannes Film Festival Awards for Best Actress for Violette Nozière (1978) and The Piano Teacher (2001). She received the Volpi Cup for Best Actress twice for Story of Women (1988) and La Cérémonie (1995). Huppert also won her first Her other films in France include Loulou (1980), La Séparation (1994), Gabrielle (2005), Amour (2012), Things to Come (2016), and Happy End (2017).

Huppert earned her first Academy Award for Best Actress nomination for her role in Elle (2016). Huppert is among international film's most prolific actresses. Her English-language films include Heaven's Gate (1980), The Bedroom Window (1987), I Heart Huckabees (2004), The Disappearance of Eleanor Rigby (2013), Louder Than Bombs (2015), Greta (2018), Frankie (2019), and Mrs. Harris Goes to Paris (2022).

Also a prolific stage actress, Huppert is the most nominated actress for the Molière Award, with eight nominations; she received an honorary award in 2017. In the same year she was awarded the Europe Theatre Prize. She made her London stage debut in the title role of the play Mary Stuart in 1996, and her New York stage debut in a 2005 production of 4.48 Psychosis. She returned to the New York stage in 2009 to perform in Heiner Müller's Quartett, and in 2014 to star in a Sydney Theatre Company production of The Maids. In 2019, Huppert starred in Florian Zeller's The Mother at the Atlantic Theater Company in New York.

Early life and career
Huppert was born on 16 March 1953, in the 16th arrondissement of Paris, the daughter of Annick (née Beau; 1914–1990), an English language teacher, and Raymond Huppert (1914–2003), a safe manufacturer. The youngest child, she has a brother and three sisters, including filmmaker Caroline Huppert. She was raised in Ville-d'Avray. Her father was Jewish; his family was from Eperjes, Austria-Hungary (now Prešov) and Alsace-Lorraine. Huppert was raised in her mother's Catholic faith. On her mother's side, she is a great-granddaughter of one of the Callot Soeurs.

Huppert was encouraged by her mother to begin acting at a young age, and became a teenage star in Paris. She later attended , where she won a prize for her acting. She is also an alumna of the Conservatoire national supérieur d'art dramatique (CNSAD).

Huppert made her television debut in 1971 with Le Prussien, and her film debut in 1972's Faustine et le Bel Été. Her later appearance in the controversial Les Valseuses (1974) made her increasingly recognized by the public. Her international breakthrough came with La Dentelliere (1977), for which she won a BAFTA award for Most Promising Newcomer to Leading Film Roles. She made her American film debut in Michael Cimino's Heaven's Gate (1980), which opened to poor reviews and was a box office failure; decades later, the film has been reassessed, with some critics considering it an overlooked masterpiece. Throughout the 1980s, Huppert continued to explore enigmatic and emotionally distant characters, most notably in Maurice Pialat's Loulou (1980), Godard's Sauve qui peut (la vie) (1980), Diane Kurys' Coup de foudre (1983), and Claude Chabrol's Une Affaire de Femmes (1988).

Later career and recent credits

In 1994, Huppert collaborated with American director Hal Hartley on Amateur, one of her few English-language performances since Heaven's Gate. She portrayed a manic and homicidal post-office worker in Claude Chabrol's La Cérémonie (1995), with Sandrine Bonnaire, and continued her cinematic relationship with Chabrol in Rien ne va plus (1997), and Merci pour le Chocolat (2000). She also appeared in Michael Haneke's The Piano Teacher (2001), which is based on a novel of the same name (Die Klavierspielerin) by Austrian author and winner of the Nobel Prize in Literature in 2004, Elfriede Jelinek. In this film, she played a piano teacher named Erika Kohut, who becomes involved with a young pianist and ladies' man, Walter Klemmer. Regarded as one of her most impressive turns, her performance netted the 2001 Best Actress prize in Cannes.

In 2004, she starred in Christophe Honoré's Ma Mère as Hélène with Louis Garrel. Here, Huppert plays an attractive middle-aged mother who has an incestuous relationship with her teenage son. Ma Mère was based on a novel by Georges Bataille. 2004 also saw her star opposite Dustin Hoffman in David O. Russell's I Heart Huckabees.

Huppert has worked in several countries since her debut. She worked in Italy (with directors Paolo and Vittorio Taviani, Mauro Bolognini, Marco Ferreri and Marco Bellocchio), in Russia (with Igor Minaiev), in Central Europe (with Werner Schroeter, Andrzej Wajda, Ursula Meier, Michael Haneke, Márta Mészáros and Aleksandar Petrović) and in Asia (with Hong Sang-soo, Brillante Mendoza and Rithy Panh).

Huppert is also an acclaimed stage actress, receiving seven Molière Award nominations, including for the titular role in a 2001 Paris production of Medea, directed by Jacques Lassalle, and in 2005, at the Odéon-Théâtre de l'Europe in Paris, in the title role of Ibsen's Hedda Gabler. Later that year, she toured the United States in a Royal Court Theatre production of Sarah Kane's theatrical piece 4.48 Psychosis. Huppert returned to the New York stage in 2009 to perform in Heiner Müller's Quartett.

Huppert was the President of the Jury at the 62nd Cannes Film Festival, in May 2009. She had been s Member of the Jury and Master of Ceremony in previous years, as well as winning the Best Actress Award twice. As president, she and her jury awarded the Palme d'Or to The White Ribbon by the Austrian director Michael Haneke, who has directed her in The Piano Teacher and Time of the Wolf.

Huppert starred in the 11th-season finale of Law & Order: Special Victims Unit which aired on 19 May 2010.

In September 2010, the Philippine Daily Inquirer announced that she had been cast in the film Captive by Filipino director Brillante Mendoza. Huppert played one of the hostages of the Dos Palmas kidnappings.

In 2012, she starred in two films that competed for the Palme d'Or at the 2012 Cannes Film Festival: Michael Haneke's Amour and Hong Sang-soo's In Another Country, with the former winning the top prize.

In 2013, she co-starred in Sydney Theatre Company's The Maids by Jean Genet, with Cate Blanchett and Elizabeth Debicki and directed by Benedict Andrews in a new English translation by Andrews and Andrew Upton. In August 2014, the production toured in New York as a part of the Lincoln Center Festival.

In 2016, she starred in two films that received widespread critical acclaim: Mia Hansen-Løve's Things to Come, which premiered at the Berlinale, and Paul Verhoeven's Elle, which premiered at Cannes. Among other awards and nominations, she won the National Society of Film Critics Award for Best Actress, New York Film Critics Circle Award for Best Actress and the Los Angeles Film Critics Association Award for Best Actress for both films. For her performance in Elle, Huppert won several awards, including the Golden Globe Award, César Award for Best Actress, Gotham Independent Film Award for Best Actress, and the Independent Spirit Award. In addition, she was nominated for the Academy Award for Best Actress and the Critics' Choice Movie Award for Best Actress.

In 2016, Huppert starred in Krzysztof Warlikowski's stage production of Phèdre(s), which toured Europe as well as BAM in New York.

In 2017, she was awarded the Europe Theatre Prize. On that occasion she performed with Jeremy Irons Correspondence 1944–1959 Readings from the epistles between Albert Camus and Maria Casares, and a special creation of Harold Pinter's Ashes to Ashes, at the Teatro Argentina in Rome.

Personal life
Huppert has been in a relationship with writer, producer and director  since 1982. They have three children, including the actress Lolita Chammah, with whom she acted in five films, including Copacabana (2010) and Barrage (2017).

Huppert is the owner of the repertory cinemas  and Ecoles Cinéma Club in Paris, which her son Lorenzo curates.

Filmography

Awards and nominations

Huppert has been nominated 16 times, becoming the most nominated actress in the history of César Awards, winning Best Actress twice: in 1996 for her work in La Cérémonie (1995), and in 2017 for her role in Elle (2016).

She is one of only four women who have twice won Best Actress at the Cannes Film Festival: in 1978 for her role in Violette Nozière by Claude Chabrol (tied with Jill Clayburgh) and in 2001 for The Piano Teacher by Michael Haneke.

She is also one of only four women who have twice received the Volpi Cup for Best Actress at the Venice Film Festival: in 1988 for her part in Une affaire de femmes (tied with Shirley MacLaine), and in 1995 for La Cérémonie (tied with her partner in the movie, Sandrine Bonnaire). Both films were directed by Claude Chabrol. Additionally, she received a Special Lion in 2005 for her role in Gabrielle.

Huppert was twice voted Best Actress at the European Film Awards: in 2001 for playing Erika Kohut in The Piano Teacher, and in 2002 with the entire cast of 8 Women (directed by François Ozon). The latter cast also won a Silver Bear for Outstanding Artistic Contribution, at the 2002 Berlin International Film Festival.

Huppert won the Golden Globe Award for Best Actress in a Motion Picture – Drama and received her first nomination for the Academy Award for Best Actress for her work in Elle.

In 2008, she received the Stanislavsky Award for outstanding achievement in acting, and devotion to the principles of the Stanislavski's system.

She was made Chevalier (Knight) of the Ordre national du Mérite on 8 December 1994 and was promoted to Officier (Officer) in 2005.

She was made Chevalier (Knight) of the Légion d'honneur on 29 September 1999 and was promoted to Officier (Officer) in 2009.

She was selected for Honorary Golden Bear Lifetime Achievement Award at 72nd Berlin International Film Festival awarded on 15 February 2022 in festival award ceremony at Berlinale Palást.

Europe Theatre Prize 
On 17 December 2017 she was awarded the XVI Europe Theatre Prize, in Rome. The Prize organization stated:From her beginnings as a stage actress, Isabelle Huppert has moved between cinema and theatre with an extraordinary productivity, and with results which have made her perhaps the most garlanded performer in the two spheres. Her name, directly linked with French and European auteur cinema, is a guarantee of quality for the productions in which she takes part: she is an artist who chooses her scripts, her roles and the directors with whom she works with the greatest care, always able to make her mark on the films in which she appears. Isabelle Huppert, a world icon in contemporary cinema, has never abandoned the theatre, an art which she continues to practise with passion, deep interest and admirable playing skills. The reasons for her passionate love of theatre, which she herself gave in her message for this year's World Theatre Day, are completely in accord with the motivation for the 16th Europe Theatre Prize, which we award to her this year with real pleasure: «Theatre for me represents the other; it is dialogue, and it is the absence of hatred. "Friendship between peoples" – now, I do not know too much about what this means, but I believe in community, in friendship between spectators and actors, in the lasting union between all the people theatre brings together – translators, educators, costume designers, stage artists, academics, practitioners and audiences. Theatre protects us; it shelters us…I believe that theatre loves us…as much as we love it… I remember an old-fashioned stage director I worked for, who, before the nightly raising of the curtain would yell, with full-throated firmness "Make way for theatre!"»

Legacy

Huppert holds the record for being the actress with the most films entered in the official competition of the Cannes Film Festival. As of 2022, she has had 22 films in the main competition and a total of 29 films screened at the festival. Huppert's frequent Cannes' appearances have led her to be dubbed "the queen of Cannes" by journalists.

David Thomson on Claude Chabrol's Madame Bovary: "[Huppert] has to rate as one of the most accomplished actresses in the world today, even if she seems short of the passion or agony of her contemporary, Isabelle Adjani." Stuart Jeffries of The Observer on The Piano Teacher: "This is surely one of the greatest performances of Huppert's already illustrious acting career, though it is one that is very hard to watch." Director, Michael Haneke: "[Huppert] has such professionalism, the way she is able to represent suffering. At one end you have the extreme of her suffering and then you have her icy intellectualism. No other actor can combine the two." Of her performance in 2007's Hidden Love, Roger Ebert said "Isabelle Huppert makes one good film after another.... she is fearless. Directors often depend on her gift for conveying depression, compulsion, egotism and despair. She can be funny and charming, but then so can a lot of actors. She is in complete command of a face that regards the void with blankness." In 2010, S.T. VanAirsdale described her as "arguably the world's greatest screen actress."

Huppert's work in Elle and Things to Come topped The Playlist'''s ranking of "The 25 Best Performances Of 2016", stating: "She runs the emotional gamut from one film to the next, carnal, savage, shattered, listless, invulnerable but exposed, a woman on the verge of collapse who refuses to succumb to her instabilities. Huppert's career spans four decades and change, plus a heap of awards and accolades, but with Elle and Things To Come'', she could well be having her best year yet."

See also
 List of actors nominated for Academy Awards for foreign language performances
 List of French Academy Award winners and nominees

Notes

References

Further reading

External links

 
 
 Isabelle Huppert at filmsdefrance.com
 
 

1953 births
Age controversies
Living people
20th-century French actresses
21st-century French actresses
Actresses from Paris
French National Academy of Dramatic Arts alumni
BAFTA Most Promising Newcomer to Leading Film Roles winners
Best Actress César Award winners
Best Actress German Film Award winners
Best Actress Lumières Award winners
Best Drama Actress Golden Globe (film) winners
Cannes Film Festival Award for Best Actress winners
David di Donatello winners
David di Donatello Career Award winners
European Film Award for Best Actress winners
French film actresses
French people of Hungarian-Jewish descent
French Roman Catholics
French stage actresses
French television actresses
French voice actresses
Independent Spirit Award for Best Female Lead winners
Officiers of the Légion d'honneur
Officers of the Ordre national du Mérite
Volpi Cup for Best Actress winners
Audiobook narrators
Honorary Golden Bear recipients